De Korte is a Dutch surname meaning "the short (one)". Thus, Pepin the Short is known as "Pepijn de Korte" in Dutch. Variants are "De Corte", "De Kort" and "De Cort", as well as concatenated forms. People with this surname include:

De Korte
Gerard de Korte (born 1955), Dutch  Roman Catholic bishop
Joke de Korte (born 1935), Dutch swimmer
 (1889–1971), Belgian sculptor
Rudolf de Korte (1936–2020), Dutch politician
DeKorte
Richard W. DeKorte (1936–1975), American (New Jersey) politician
De Kort
Bram de Kort (born 1991), Dutch racing cyclist
Gérard de Kort (born 1963), Dutch swimmer
Hein de Kort (born 1956), Dutch cartoonist
Kees de Kort (born 1934), Dutch painter and illustrator
Koen de Kort (born 1982), Dutch cyclist
Dekort
Michael DeKort, American whistleblower
De Corte
Jean De Corte (1551–1628), gunpowder manufacturer from Liège
Josse de Corte (1627–1679), Flemish sculptor
Jules de Corte (1924–1996), Dutch blind singer-songwriter
Marcel De Corte (1929–2017), Belgian footballer
Thomas De Corte (born 1988), Belgian footballer
Wim De Corte (born 1971), Belgian football manager
Decorte
Alphonse Decorte (1909–1977), Belgian footballer
Raymond Decorte (1898–1972), Belgian road bicycle racer
De Cort
Frans de Cort (1834–1878), Flemish writer
Hendrik de Cort (1742/5–1810), Flemish landscape painter

See also
Korte (disambiguation)

Dutch-language surnames